The Stolpersteine in the Ústecký kraj lists the Stolpersteine in the Ústí nad Labem Region (Czech: Ústecký kraj) in the north-west of Bohemia. Stolpersteine is the German name for stumbling blocks collocated all over Europe by German artist Gunter Demnig. They remember the fate of the Nazi victims being murdered, deported, exiled or driven to suicide.

Generally, the stumbling blocks are posed in front of the building where the victims had their last self chosen residence. The name of the Stolpersteine in Czech is: Kameny zmizelých, stones of the disappeared.

The lists are sortable; the basic order follows the alphabet according to the last name of the victim.

Děčín

Teplice

Žatec

Dates of collocations 
The Stolpersteine in the Ústecký kraj were collocated by the artist himself on the following dates:
 15 June 2011: Teplice (Irma Bloch, Lisbeth Feldstein, Heinrich Lederer, Hugo Löbl, Rudolf Perutz, Emil Schling, Dr. Bruno Spitzer, Alfred Urbach)
 17 July 2013: Teplice  (names or addresses to be added)
 12 September 2014: Děčín and Žatec

The Czech Stolperstein project was initiated in 2008 by the Česká unie židovské mládeže (Czech Union of Jewish Youth) and was realized with the patronage of the Mayor of Prague.

See also 
 List of cities by country that have stolpersteine
 Stolpersteine in the Czech Republic

External links

 stolpersteine.eu, Demnig's website
 holocaust.cz
 Stolpersteine in Teplice

References

Ústecký kraj